Buke Ta is a subdistrict municipality (thesaban tambon) in Waeng district, Narathiwat Province, Thailand. The municipality lies west of the Kolok River.

History
The municipality was created as a sanitary district (sukhaphiban) in 1993. Like all sanitary districts it was upgraded to a subdistrict municipality in 1999.

Traffic
A crossing on the Malaysia-Thailand border to the neighboring Malaysian town of Bukit Bunga in Kelantan state was opened in December 2007, crossing the Kolok River with the Bukit Bunga–Ban Buketa Bridge.

References

Populated places in Narathiwat province
Malaysia–Thailand border crossings